Susan Nakhumicha Wafula is a Kenyan politician and supply chain expert who was recently appointed as the new Cabinet Minister for Health.She oversaw supplies for the Global Programme for Research and Training at the University of California, San Francisco (UCSF). She worked at the Nairobi Women's Hospital as the manager of procurement and logistics as well.

References

Kenyan women in politics
Kenyan politicians